Hodh or  is a region of West Africa. Previously administered as part of French Sudan (present-day Mali), the area was transferred to French Mauritania in 1944, apparently on a whim of the colonial governor Laigret. The transfer was still resented upon Mali's independence. Formerly more fertile, it is now largely a barren waste.

It gave its name to the modern Mauritanian regions of Hodh Ech Chargui and Hodh El Gharbi.

References

Regions of West Africa
Geography of Mali
Geography of Mauritania
West Africa